Momčilo Tapavica (14 October 1872 – 10 January 1949) was an all-around sportsperson, competing in tennis, weightlifting, wrestling. Tapavica achieved his best result in tennis by winning the singles bronze medal at the 1896 Summer Olympics, making him the first ethnic Serb, Slav and Hungarian citizen to win an Olympic medal. After his sporting career Tapavica became a well-known architect.

Sports career
Tapavica, an ethnic Serb, was born in Nádalja, Kingdom of Hungary (now Nadalj, Serbia) in 1872. He began to practise sports in Újvidék (Novi Sad), continuing his training in Budapest, where he studied architecture and civil engineering at the Technical College. His performances excelled and he was selected in the Hungarian team for the first Olympic Games in Athens in 1896, where he competed in tennis, weightlifting and wrestling.

At the 1896 Summer Olympics, Tapavica, being the lone tennis player in Hungary's Olympic Team, won the bronze medal in the singles tennis tournament.

In the first round, he defeated D. Frangopoulos of Greece. The second round gave him a bye, subsequently Dionysios Kasdaglis of Egypt beat Tapavica in the semifinal, and with no playoff for third place he shared bronze medal honors with Greek Konstantinos Paspatis. Tapavica was the first ethnic Serb to win an Olympic medal, as well as the first – and to date the only – Hungarian to win a medal in tennis at the Olympic Games. He did not compete in the doubles tournament.

In weightlifting, Tapavica overextended himself, which caused him a shoulder injury and eventually finished last of the six competitors in the two-handed weightlifting, now known as the clean and jerk. Two days later, still unhealed, Tapavica was defeated in the first round of the wrestling competition by Stephanos Christopoulos. The two were nearly evenly matched, but Tapavica tired first and conceded.

After the Olympic Games, Tapavica never again participated in competitive events, however he continued to do recreational sports, such as athletics, gymnastics and rowing. For many years he was a member of the Újvidék-based rowing club Danubius.

Architecture achievements

After his graduation, Tapavica remained in Budapest for a shorter period before returning to Újvidék. In 1908, for the invitation of Nicholas I of Montenegro, Tapavica went to Montenegro, where he designed several buildings. Among his notable works from this period are the German Embassy and National Bank in Cetinje, and the building of Boka Hotel in Herceg Novi, which was destroyed by an earthquake in 1979. The building of an orphanage funded by Marija Trandafil's will was built in Novi Sad based on the plans of Tapavica, was finished in 1912. The building would later become the Matica srpska.

Upon the outbreak of World War I, Tapavica first emigrated to Austria-Hungary, and later through Rome and Lausanne he ended up in Morocco. While in Morocco, he joined the French Foreign Legion and became friends with Spain's future dictator Francisco Franco.

After the war he returned to Novi Sad, where he ran his own architectural design company and actively participated in discussions about the urban planning of the city. Following World War II, in 1948, he moved to Poreč, where he significantly contributed to the rebuilding of the war-torn city. He died in 1949 in Pula.

Legacy

His life is the subject of a 2016 documentary Tapavica directed by Milan Todorović. A bust is bestowed in his honor in Novi Sad.

See also
 List of Serbian architects

References

External links
 Tapavica - documentary movie

1872 births
1949 deaths
People from Srbobran
Serbs of Vojvodina
Tennis players at the 1896 Summer Olympics
19th-century male tennis players
Weightlifters at the 1896 Summer Olympics
19th-century sportsmen
Wrestlers at the 1896 Summer Olympics
Hungarian male sport wrestlers
Hungarian male tennis players
Serbian male tennis players
Hungarian male weightlifters
Serbian male weightlifters
Serbian male sport wrestlers
Olympic tennis players of Hungary
Olympic weightlifters of Hungary
Olympic wrestlers of Hungary
Olympic bronze medalists for Hungary
Olympic medalists in tennis
People associated with physical culture
Hungarian architects
Serbian architects
Medalists at the 1896 Summer Olympics
Soldiers of the French Foreign Legion